John Bent may refer to:

 John Bent (politician) ( 1775–1848), MP for Sligo Borough and Totnes
 John Bent (brewer) (1793–1857), English brewer and Mayor of Liverpool
 Johnny Bent (1908–2004), American hockey player